The Agreement between the United States of America, the United Mexican States, and Canada (USMCA)  is a free trade agreement between Canada, Mexico, and the United States. It replaced the North American Free Trade Agreement (NAFTA) implemented in 1994, and is sometimes characterized as "NAFTA 2.0", or "New NAFTA", since it largely maintains or updates the provisions of its predecessor. USMCA created one of the world's largest free trade zones, spanning roughly 500 million people and totaling over $26 trillion in GDP (PPP).

USMCA resulted from renegotiations between the NAFTA member states beginning in 2017; characterized as "tumultuous", these centered primarily on "auto exports, steel and aluminum tariffs, and the dairy, egg, and poultry markets". All sides came to a formal agreement on October 1, 2018, and U.S. President Donald Trump proposed USMCA during the G20 Summit the following month, where it was signed by himself, Mexican President Enrique Peña Nieto, and Canadian Prime Minister Justin Trudeau. A revised version reflecting additional consultations was signed on December 10, 2019 and ratified by all three countries, with Canada being the last to ratify on March 13, 2020. Following notification by all three governments that the provisions were ready for domestic implementation, the agreement came into effect on July 1, 2020.

USMCA is primarily a modernization of the 25-year-old NAFTA, namely with respect to intellectual property and digital trade, and borrows language from the Comprehensive and Progressive Agreement for Trans-Pacific Partnership (CPTPP), of which Canada and Mexico are signatories. Key changes from its predecessor include increased environmental and working regulations; greater incentives for automobile production in the U.S. (with quotas for Canadian and Mexican automotive production); more access to Canada's dairy market; and an increased duty-free limit for Canadians who buy U.S. goods online.

Background and nomenclature

The United States–Mexico–Canada Agreement is based substantially on the North American Free Trade Agreement (NAFTA), which came into effect on January 1, 1994. The present agreement was the result of more than a year of negotiations including possible tariffs by the United States against Canada in addition to the possibility of separate bilateral deals instead.

During the 2016 U.S. presidential election, Donald Trump's campaign included the promise to renegotiate NAFTA, or cancel it if re-negotiations were to fail. Upon election, Trump proceeded to make a number of changes affecting trade relations with other countries. Withdrawing from the Paris Agreement, ceasing to be part of negotiations for the Trans-Pacific Partnership, and significantly increasing tariffs with China were some of the steps he implemented, reinforcing that he was serious about seeking changes to NAFTA. Much of the debate surrounding the virtues and faults of the USMCA is similar to that surrounding all free trade agreements (FTAs), for instance, the nature of FTA's as public goods, potential infringements of national sovereignty, and the role of business, labor, environmental, and consumer interests in shaping the language of trade deals.

The agreement is sometimes referred to as "New NAFTA" in reference to the previous trilateral agreement it is meant to supersede, the North American Free Trade Agreement (NAFTA).

Negotiations 

The formal negotiation process began on May 18, 2017, when the US Trade Representative (USTR), Robert Lighthizer, notified Congress that he intended to renegotiate NAFTA starting in 90 days. In accordance with Trade Promotion Authority statutes, the USTR released its key negotiating objectives document on July 7, 2017. Negotiations began on August 16, 2017, and continued with eight formal rounds of talks until April 8, 2018. Lacking any resolution, Lighthizer stated on May 2, 2018, that if by the end of the month no deal was reached, negotiations would be halted until 2019. This statement was motivated by the pending change of government in Mexico, in which the then-incoming president, Andrés Manuel López Obrador, disagreed with much of the negotiated language and might be unwilling to sign the deal.

Separately, on May 11, 2018, Speaker of the House Paul Ryan set May 17 as a deadline for Congressional action. This deadline was disregarded, and the deal with Mexico was not reached until August 27, 2018. At this time Canada had not agreed to the presented deal. Because Mexico's outgoing president, Enrique Peña Nieto, left office on December 1, 2018, and 60 days are required as a review period, the deadline for providing the agreed text was the end of September 30, 2018, which was reached precisely on September 30. Negotiators worked around the clock and completed the agreement less than an hour before midnight of that date on a draft text. The next day on October 1, 2018, the USMCA text was published as an agreed-to document.  Lighthizer credited Jared Kushner with architecting the deal and rescuing it several times from collapse.

The agreed text of the agreement was signed by leaders of all three countries on November 30, 2018, as a side event to the 2018 G20 summit in Buenos Aires, Argentina. The English, Spanish, and French versions would be equally authentic, and the agreement would take effect after ratification from all three states through the passage of enabling legislation.

U.S. Ambassador to Canada Kelly Craft played a leadership role in trade negotiations between the US and Canada, resulting in the signing of the new trade agreement. Her work in hammering out the trilateral agreement raised her stock with the Trump administration. It was later revealed in a memoir published by Stephen Schwarzman, the CEO and founder of American LBO specialist The Blackstone Group, that he had incited Justin Trudeau to concede the protected dairy market in the USMCA negotiations. According to Schwarzman, Trudeau feared that a recession would affect his government's prospects during the 2019 Canadian federal election. The executive, who had been retained by Trump, also was invited in January 2017 to address the Liberal Cabinet at a Calgary retreat when the Cabinet would be unprotected by its Privy Council Office civil servants. Then, as the negotiations reached their end on October 1, 2018 at a last-minute behind-the-scenes meeting at the United Nations in New York City, Trudeau sacrificed the dairy industry to save the media industry and the automotive exemption. Chrystia Freeland, the Foreign Affairs minister from Trinity-Spadina riding in downtown Toronto whose constituents include many staff of the CBC and The Globe and Mail and the Toronto Star and the Toronto Sun, maps "Canadian culture" directly onto the media industry. Robert Fife in an election cycle article failed to obtain any comment from other than the Liberal party.

Fox News reported on December 9, 2019, that negotiators from the three countries reached an agreement on enforcement, paving the way for a final deal within 24 hours and ratification by all three parties before the end of the year. Mexico agreed to the enforcement of a minimum wage of US$16/hour for Mexican automotive workers by a "neutral" third party. Mexico, which imports all of its aluminum, also expressed opposition to provisions regarding American steel and aluminum contents in automobile components.

Provisions 
Provisions of the agreement cover a wide range, including agricultural produce, homelessness, manufactured products, labor conditions, digital trade, among others. Some of the more prominent aspects of the agreement include giving US dairy farmers greater access to the Canadian market, guidelines to have a higher proportion of automobiles manufactured amongst the three nations rather than imported from elsewhere, and retention of the dispute resolution system similar to that included in NAFTA.

Dairy 
The dairy provisions give the U.S. tariff-free access to 3.6%, up from 3.25% under the never-ratified Trans-Pacific Partnership, of the $15.2 billion (as of 2016) Canadian dairy market. Canada agreed to eliminate Class 7 pricing provisions on certain dairy products, while Canada's domestic supply management system remains in place. Canada agreed to raise the duty-free limit on purchases from the U.S. to $150 from the previous $20 level, allowing Canadian consumers to have greater duty-free access to the U.S market.

Automobiles 
Automobile rules of origin (ROO) requirements mandate that a certain portion of an automobile's value must come from within the governed region. In NAFTA, the required portion was 62.5 percent. The USMCA increases this requirement by 12.5 percentage points, to 75 percent of the automobile's value. The initial proposal from the Trump administration was an increase to 85 percent, and an added stipulation that 50 percent of the automotive content be made by United States auto manufacturers. While the deal's text did not include the more demanding version of this provision, there is concern that the increased domestic sourcing, aimed at promoting US employment, will come with higher input costs and disruptions to existing supply chains.

De minimis 

To facilitate greater cross-border trade, the United States has reached an agreement with Mexico and Canada to raise its de minimis shipment value levels.  Canada will raise its de minimis level for the first time in decades, from C$20 (US$) to C$40 (US$) for taxes.  Canada will also provide for duty-free shipments up to C$150 (US$). Mexico will continue to provide US$50 tax-free de minimis and also provide duty-free shipments up to the equivalent level of US$117.  Shipment values up to these levels would enter with minimal formal entry procedures, making it easier for more businesses, especially small- and medium-sized ones, to be a part of cross-border trade.  Canada will also allow 90 days after entry for the importer to make payment of taxes.

Labor 

USMCA Annex 23-A requires Mexico to pass legislation that improves the collective bargaining capabilities of labor unions. The specific standards Mexico is required to comply with are detailed in the International Labour Organization's Convention 98 on freedom of association and collective bargaining. The administration of Mexico's president, Andrés Manuel López Obrador, introduced legislation in late 2018 which pursues compliance with these international standards.

Other labor-related measures include a minimum wage requirement in the automotive industry. Specifically, 40 to 45 percent of the automobiles manufactured in North America must be made in a factory that pays a minimum of $16 per hour. This measure will be phased in during the first five years after USMCA ratification.

Intellectual property 
The USMCA extends the copyright length in Canada to life plus 70 years, and 75 years for sound recordings. This extension mirrors the same IP policy captured in the text of the Trans-Pacific Partnership, paragraph 18.63. Furthermore, biotechnological firms would have at least 10 years exclusivity period for agricultural chemicals (double the current 5), and industrial designs' period would "jump" from current 10 to 15 years. Compared to NAFTA, USMCA would require criminal penalties and civil remedies be available for both satellite and cable theft, reaffirm the Doha Declaration on the TRIPS Agreement and Public Health, contain the strongest due process and transparency requirements for Geographic Indicator protection systems in any FTA, require criminal procedures and penalties for recording copyrighted movies in movie theaters, and require ex officio authority for customs officials to stop suspected counterfeit goods.

Pharmaceuticals 
USMCA provides for a patent term extension where there is an “unreasonable curtailment” of a pharmaceutical's patent term stemming from delays in the regulatory or marketing approval process.

USMCA accounts for data exclusivity of new pharmaceutical products. New pharmaceutical products are those which do not contain a chemical entity that has been previously approved in that Party. Generic manufacturers are prohibited from relying on the innovator's previously undisclosed safety / efficacy testing for at least five years from the date marketing approval was first granted. Mexico agreed to extend its data protection of new pharmaceutical products. Canada's data protection regime already offered an eight-year exclusivity period for innovative drugs and thus was not required to make changes.

Initially, the parties contemplated creating an exclusivity period for new products containing biologics for at least ten years from the approval date. Biologics are defined as a product that is “produced using biotechnology processes and that is, or, alternatively, contains, a virus, therapeutic serum, toxin, antitoxin, vaccine, blood, blood component or derivative, allergenic product, protein, or analogous product, for use in human beings for the prevention, treatment, or cure of a disease or condition.” This period would have been longer than the exclusivity periods of both Canada and Mexico, but shorter than that of the United States. This provision was heavily criticized for its potential to limit access to biologic medications and make them unaffordable. Thus, biologics were covered in the definition of “new pharmaceutical products” and are instead eligible for a minimum five-year protection period.

Elimination of foreign office and local presence requirements 

The USMCA sunset clause would eliminate the need for companies to establish headquarters in any other USMCA country. It will encourage cross-border business by excluding US companies from the need to localize data, open a Canadian or Mexican HQ. For example, McDonald's Canada or Apple Canada could both cease to exist and the surviving entities would be a North American McDonald's or Apple.

Dispute settlement mechanisms 
There are three primary dispute settlement mechanisms contained in NAFTA. Chapter 20 is the country-to-country resolution mechanism. It is often regarded as the least contentious of the three mechanisms, and it was sustained in its original NAFTA form in USMCA. Such cases would involve complaints between USMCA member states that a term of the agreement had been violated. Chapter 19 disputes manage the justifications of anti-dumping or countervailing duties. Without Chapter 19, the legal recourse for managing these policies would be through the domestic legal system. Chapter 19 specifies that a USMCA Panel will hear the case and act as an International Trade Court in arbitrating the dispute. The Trump administration attempted to remove Chapter 19 from the new USMCA text, though it has thus far endured in the agreement.

Chapter 11 is the third mechanism, known as investor-state dispute settlement, wherein multinational corporations are enabled to sue participating governments over allegedly discriminatory policies. Chapter 11 is broadly considered the most controversial of the settlement mechanisms. The Canadian negotiators effectively removed themselves from Chapter 11 in the USMCA version of this measure, Chapter 14. Canada will have a full exemption from ISDS three years after NAFTA has been terminated.

Beyond the Border accord 

In addition to building on the existing NAFTA fused with elements from the Trans-Pacific Partnership, the USMCA also incorporates elements from the "Beyond the Border" accord signed by Prime Minister Stephen Harper and former president Barack Obama, most notably the "single window" initiative and folding the "Regulatory Cooperation Council" into the "Good Regulatory Governance" chapter 28 of the new accord.

Sunset clause 
Additionally, there is a stipulation that the agreement itself must be reviewed by the three nations every six years, with a 16-year sunset clause. The agreement can be extended for additional 16-year terms during the six-year reviews. The introduction of the sunset clause places more control in shaping the future of the USMCA in the hands of domestic governments. However, there is concern that this can create greater uncertainty. Sectors such as automotive manufacturing require significant investment in cross-border supply chains. Given the dominance of the United States consumer market, this will likely pressure firms to locate more production in the US, with a greater likelihood of increased production costs for those vehicles.

Currency 
A new addition in the USMCA is the inclusion of Chapter 33 which covers Macroeconomic Policies and Exchange Rate Matters. This is considered significant because it could set a precedent for future trade agreements. Chapter 33 establishes requirements for currency and macroeconomic transparency which, if violated, would constitute grounds for a Chapter 20 dispute appeal. The US, Canada, and Mexico are all currently in compliance with these transparency requirements in addition to the substantive policy requirements which align with the International Monetary Fund Articles of Agreement.

Article 32.10  
The USMCA will affect how member countries negotiate future free trade deals. Article 32.10 requires USMCA countries to notify USMCA members three months in advance if they intend to begin free trade negotiations with non-market economies. Article 32.10 permits USMCA countries the ability to review any new free trade deals members agree to go forward. Article 32.10 is widely speculated to be targeting China in intent. In fact, a senior White House official said in connection to the USMCA deal that "We have been very concerned about the efforts of China to essentially undermine the US position by entering into arrangements with others."

Against exchange rate manipulation 
The USMCA countries are to abide IMF standards aimed to prevent the manipulation of exchange rates. The agreement calls for public disclosure of market interventions. The IMF can be summoned to act as a referee if the parties dispute.

Against state-owned enterprises 
State-owned enterprises, which are favored by China as levers for exercising its dominance, are prevented from receiving unfair subsidies when compared to private enterprise.

Status 

The USMCA was signed on November 30, 2018, by all three parties at the G20 summit in Buenos Aires, as had been planned the preceding months. However, continue disputes over labor rights, steel, and aluminum prevented ratification of this version of the agreement. Consequently, Canadian Deputy Prime Minister Chrystia Freeland, U.S. Trade Representative Robert Lightizer and Mexican Undersecretary for North America Jesus Seade formally signed a revised agreement on December 10, 2019, which was ratified by all three countries by March 13, 2020.

United States

Domestic procedures for ratification of the agreement are governed by the Trade Promotion Authority legislation, otherwise known as "fast track" authority.

Growing objections within the member states about U.S. trade policy and various aspects of the USMCA affected the signing and ratification process. Mexico stated they would not sign the USMCA if steel and aluminum tariffs remained. There was speculation after the results of the November 6, 2018 U.S. midterm elections that the Democrats' increased power in the House of Representatives might interfere with the passage of the USMCA agreement. Senior Democrat Bill Pascrell argued for changes to the USMCA to enable it to pass Congress. Republicans opposed USMCA provisions requiring labor rights for LGBTQ and pregnant workers. Forty Congressional Republicans urged Trump against signing a deal that contained "the unprecedented inclusion of sexual orientation and gender identity language"; as a result, Trump ultimately signed a revised version that committed each nation only to "policies that it considers appropriate to protect workers against employment discrimination" and clarified that the United States would not be required to introduce any additional nondiscrimination laws. The Canadian government expressed concern about the changes evolving within the USMCA agreement.

On December 2, 2018, Trump announced he would begin the six-month process to withdraw from NAFTA, adding that Congress needed either to ratify the USMCA or else revert to pre-NAFTA trading rules. Academics had debated whether the president can unilaterally withdraw from the pact without Congressional approval.

On March 1, 2019, organizations representing the U.S. agricultural sector announced their support for the USMCA and urged Congress to ratify the agreement. They also urged the Trump administration to continue upholding NAFTA until the new trade agreement is ratified. However, on March 4, House Ways and Means Chairman Richard Neal predicted a "very hard" path through Congress for the deal. Starting March 7, senior White House officials met with House Ways and Means members, as well as moderate caucuses from both parties, such as the Problem Solvers Caucus, the Tuesday Group, and the Blue Dog Coalition in their efforts to gain support for ratification. The Trump administration has also backed down from the threat of withdrawing from NAFTA as the negotiations with Congress continued.

On May 30, 2019, USTR Lighthizer submitted to Congress a draft statement on administrative measures concerning the implementation of the U.S.-Mexico-Canada Agreement (USMCA and the new NAFTA) in accordance with the Presidential Trade Promotion Authority (TPA) Act 2015 (Statement of Administrative Action). The draft would allow USMCA implementation legislation to be submitted to Congress after 30 days, thus on or after June 29. In a letter sent to Nancy Pelosi, Speaker of the House of Representatives, and Kevin McCarthy, House Minority Leader, Lighthizer said that the USMCA is the gold standard in U.S. trade policy, modernizing U.S. competitive digital trade, intellectual property, and services provisions and creating a level playing field for U.S. companies, workers and farmers, an agreement that represents a fundamental rebalancing of trade relations between Mexico and Canada.

With the draft statement on administrative measures submitted, Speaker Pelosi issued a statement  that U.S. Trade Representative Lighthizer should confirm that the draft wording of the USMCA would benefit U.S. workers and farmers and that although she agreed on the need to revise NAFTA, stricter enforcement of labor and environmental protection standards was needed.

President Donald Trump warned on September 25, 2019 that an impeachment inquiry against him could derail congressional approval of USMCA, dragging down Mexico's peso and stock market as investors fled riskier assets.

The U.S. House of Representatives was proceeding with work on USMCA, U.S. House Speaker Nancy Pelosi said on September 26, 2019.

Bloomberg News reported on October 29, 2019, that the Trump administration planned to include in the legislation approving the pact a provision that would allow the USTR to directly control how and where cars and parts are made by global automakers.

On December 19, 2019, the United States House of Representatives passed the USMCA with bipartisan support by a vote of 385 (Democratic 193, Republican 192) to 41 (Democratic 38, Republican 2, Independent 1). On January 16, 2020, the United States Senate passed the trade agreement by a vote of 89 (Democratic 38, Republican 51) to 10 (Democratic 8, Republican 1, Independent 1) and the bill was forwarded to the White House for Trump's signature. On January 29, 2020, Trump signed the agreement into law (Public Law No: 116–113). It officially amended NAFTA but not the 1989 Canada–United States Free Trade Agreement which is only "suspended," so in case parties fail to extend or renew it in 6 years, FTA would become the law.

On April 24, 2020, Lighthizer gave official notice to Congress that the new trade deal was set to come to force on July 1, 2020, and notified Canada and Mexico to that effect. On June 1, 2020, the USTR released the "Uniform Regulations", which help interpret the different chapters of the USMCA, primarily chapters 4–7, paving the way for the Agreement to take effect domestically; NAFTA was consequently replaced the following month, on July 1, 2020.

Mexico

On November 27, 2018, the government of Mexico said it would give to Jared Kushner its highest civilian honor, the Order of the Aztec Eagle, for his work in negotiating the USMCA.

On June 19, 2019, the Senate of Mexico passed the treaty's ratification bill on first reading in a 114–4 vote, with three abstentions. The treaty was passed on its second and final reading by the Senate on December 12, 2019, by a vote of 107–1.

On April 3, 2020, Mexico announced it was ready to implement the agreement, joining Canada, though it requested that its automotive industry be given extra time to comply.

Manufacturing in Mexico accounts for 17% of GDP.  However, Andrés Manuel López Obrador, the Mexican president believes that this trade deal will be a net positive for the Mexican economy by growing foreign investments, creating jobs, and expanding trade.

Canada

On May 29, 2019, prime minister Justin Trudeau introduced a CUSMA implementation bill in the House of Commons. On June 20, it passed second reading in the House of Commons and was referred to the Standing Committee on International Trade.

Governor General of Canada Julie Payette declared the dissolution of the 42nd Canadian Parliament on September 11, 2019, and formally issued the writs of election for the 2019 Canadian federal election. All pending legislation is scrapped upon any dissolution of Parliament, meaning that the CUSMA implementation bill needed to be re-introduced in the 43rd Canadian Parliament which began on December 5, 2019.

On December 10, 2019, a revised CUSMA agreement was reached by the three countries. On January 29, 2020, deputy prime minister and Minister of Intergovernmental Affairs Chrystia Freeland introduced CUSMA implementation bill C-4 in the House of Commons and it passed first reading without a recorded vote. On February 6, the bill passed second reading in the House of Commons on a vote of 275 to 28, with the Bloc Québécois voting against and all other parties voting in favor, and it was referred to the Standing Committee on International Trade. On February 27, 2020, the committee voted to send the bill to the full House for third reading, without amendments.

On March 13, 2020, the House of Commons passed bill C-4 to implement CUSMA before suspending itself for 6 weeks due to the COVID-19 pandemic. Due to the "extraordinary circumstances", the third and final reading of the bill was deemed to be approved without a recorded vote, as part of an omnibus adjournment motion unanimously approved by all members present. Prime Minister Justin Trudeau was not present, since he was in self-isolation at home after his wife Sophie Grégoire Trudeau tested positive for COVID-19 infection. On the same day, the Senate passed first, second, and third readings of the bill without recorded votes, and Governor General Julie Payette granted royal assent and it became law, thus completing Canada's ratification of the legislation.

On April 3, 2020, Canada notified the United States and Mexico that it completed its domestic ratification process of the agreement.

Effects and analysis

Similarities to NAFTA
During his 2016 election campaign and presidency, Trump was highly critical of NAFTA (oftentimes describing it as "perhaps the worst trade deal ever made") while extolling USMCA as "a terrific deal for all of us." The USMCA is very similar to NAFTA, carrying over many of the same provisions and making only modest, mostly cosmetic changes, and is expected to have only a minor economic effect. Former U.S. Trade Representative Mickey Kantor, who oversaw the signing of NAFTA during the Bill Clinton administration, said, "It's really the original NAFTA."

Response
Representatives from the American Federation of Labor and Congress of Industrial Organizations (AFL–CIO) have criticized the labor standards in the USMCA as unenforceable and toothless. Senator Elizabeth Warren of Massachusetts said "the new rules will make it harder to bring down drug prices for seniors and anyone else who needs access to life-saving medicine", reflecting on the measure that expands the patent length for biological substances to 10 years, limiting access for new generic drugs to enter the market.

The Trump administration's Office of the U.S. Trade Representative has proposed the USMCA, citing new digital trade measures, the strengthening of protection for trade secrets, and the automobile rules-of-origin adjustments, as some of the benefits of the trade agreement.

In 2018 Jim Balsillie, former chair of once-dominant handheld telephone firm Research In Motion, wrote that the "colonial supplicant attitude" of Canadian politicians was a wrong-headed approach to the data and IP provisions of the USMCA.

A report published in summer 2018 was that the National Research Council of Canada feared that domestic firms run the risk of becoming "data cows" of foreign big data under the provisions of the USMCA.

Economic effects
USMCA is projected to have a very small effect on the economy. An International Monetary Fund (IMF) working paper issued in late March 2019 found that the agreement would have "negligible" effects on the broad economy. The IMF study projected that the USMCA "would adversely affect trade in the automotive, textiles and apparel sectors, while generating modest aggregate gains in terms of welfare, mostly driven by improved goods market access, with a negligible effect on real GDP." The IMF study noted that the USMCA's economic benefits would be greatly enhanced if there were an end to the Trump trade war (i.e., if the U.S. eliminated tariffs on steel and aluminum imports from Canada and Mexico, and Canada and Mexico dropped retaliatory tariffs on imports from the U.S.)

An April 2019 International Trade Commission analysis on the likely effect of the USMCA estimated that the agreement, when fully implemented (six years following ratification) would increase U.S. real GDP by 0.35% and would increase U.S. total employment by 0.12% (176,000 jobs).<ref name=ITC>United States-Mexico-Canada Agreement: Likely Impact on the U.S. Economy and Specific Industry Sectors  (with errata), United States International Trade Commission, Publication No. 4889, Investigation No. TPA 105-003 (April 2019).</ref> The analysis cited by another study from the Congressional Research Service found the agreement would not have a measurable effect on jobs, wages, or overall economic growth. In the summer of 2019, Trump's top economic advisor Larry Kudlow (the director of the National Economic Council in the Trump White House) made unsupported claims regarding the likely economic benefits of the agreement, overstating projections related to jobs and GDP growth.

In December 2019, Thea M. Lee and Robert E. Scott of the Economic Policy Institute criticized USMCA as "weak tea, at best" because it would have "virtually no measurable impacts on wages or incomes for U.S. workers," noting that "The benefits are tiny, and it's highly uncertain whether the deal will be a net winner or loser, in the end."

In June 2020, the Nikkei Asian Review reported that Japanese auto companies are opting to "triple Mexican pay rather than move to US" in order to avoid tariffs on automotive parts.

 See also 

 North American integration
 Comprehensive and Progressive Agreement for Trans-Pacific Partnership (CPTPP)
 North American Free Trade Agreement (NAFTA)
 North American Leaders' Summit (NALS)
 Trans-Pacific Partnership (TPP)
 US public opinion on the North American Free Trade Agreement
 China–United States trade war

Notes

 References 

Further reading
 Beaulieu, Eugene, and Dylan Klemen. "You Say USMCA or T-MEC and I Say CUSMA: The New NAFTA-Let's Call the Whole Thing On." The School of Public Policy Publications'' (2020) online.

External links 

 Agreement between the United States of America, the United Mexican States, and Canada 12/13/19 Text, subject to legal review on the official website of the Office of the United States Trade Representative.

2018 establishments in North America
2018 in American politics
2018 in Canadian politics
2018 in Mexican politics
2019 in American politics
2019 in Canadian politics
2019 in Mexican politics
2020 in American politics
2020 in Canadian politics
2020 in Mexican politics
Economy of North America
History of Canada (1992–present)
Modern Mexico
Presidency of Donald Trump
Trilateral relations of Canada, Mexico, and the United States
Free trade agreements of Canada
Free trade agreements of Mexico
Free trade agreements of the United States
Treaties concluded in 2018
Trade blocs
Territorial entities in North America
 
Canada–United States trade relations
Free-trade areas
International organizations based in the Americas